Trinidad and Tobago is scheduled to compete at the 2024 Summer Olympics in Paris from 26 July to 11 August 2024. It will be the nation's nineteenth appearance at the Summer Olympics, although the Trinidad and Tobago athletes previously appeared in four other editions as a British colony and as part of the West Indies Federation.

Competitors
The following is the list of number of competitors in the Games.

Swimming

Swimmers from Trinidad and Tobago achieved the entry standards in the following events for Paris 2024 (a maximum of two swimmers under the Olympic Qualifying Time (OST) and potentially at the Olympic Consideration Time (OCT)):

References

2024
Nations at the 2024 Summer Olympics
2024 in Trinidad and Tobago sport